68th Golden Reel Awards
April 16, 2021

Dialogue and ADR:
The Trial of the Chicago 7

Sound Effects and Foley:
Greyhound
The 68th Golden Reel Awards, were held on April 16, 2021 by the Motion Picture Sound Editors (M.P.S.E.) to honor the best in sound editing for film, television, computer entertainment and student productions. The nominations were announced on March 1, 2021.

Winners and nominees
The winners are on bold.

Film

Broadcast Media

Gaming

Student Film

References

External links
 MPSE.org

2020 film awards
2020 in American cinema